Diet of Regensburg may refer any of the sessions of the Imperial Diet, Imperial States, or the prince-electors of the Holy Roman Empire which took place in the Imperial City of Regensburg (Ratisbon), now in Germany.

An incomplete lists of Diets of Regensburg (Ratisbon) includes :

 Diet of Regensburg (976)
 Diet of Regensburg (1454), where bishop Giovanni Castiglione represented Pope Nicholas V
 Diet of Regensburg (1471)
 Diet of Regensburg (1532)
Diet of Regensburg (1541) (Colloquy of Ratisbon)
 , where bishop Michael Helding served as a Roman Catholic delegate
 Diet of Regensburg (1556/57)
 Diet of Regensburg (1567)
 Diet of Regensburg (1576)
 Diet of Regensburg (1594)
 Diet of Regensburg (1597/98)
 
 Diet of Regensburg (1603)
 Diet of Regensburg (1608)
 Diet of Regensburg (1613)
Diet of Regensburg (1623)
Diet of Regensburg (1630)
 Diet of Regensburg (1640/41)
 Diet of Regensburg (1653/54)
Perpetual Diet of Regensburg (1663–1806)

See also
Regensburg Interim

References

Regensburg